Wensley Grosvenor Haydon-Baillie (born 1943) is the son of a surgeon from Worksop, Nottinghamshire, was once one of the 50 richest men in the UK after working his way up in the pharmaceutical industry. A company he invested in, Porton International, sold at high prices when it seemed it had a cure for herpes. It collapsed when it turned out it did not and the company wound up selling at a discounted price to Ipsen Pharmaceutical. 

He owned a collection of Rolls-Royces and an aviation museum housing and restoring many Spitfires. He also owned Wentworth Woodhouse in Yorkshire – one of the largest private homes in Europe with an assumed 365 rooms. In the 1980s, he invested millions in a firm that claimed to have a cure for herpes but it never materialised and in 1998 he admitted to debts of £13m. 

In 1994, Haydon-Baillie married Samantha Acland, a secretary. He was once the owner of the two largest passenger hovercraft in the world, the SRN4s, and also one of the fastest boats in the world, the GTY Brave Challenger.

Haydon-Baillie is a descendant of Royal Navy officer Jeremiah Coghlan.

References

thepeerage.com
Wedding Photos
 My doomed love affair with England's greatest house, Transforming Network Infrastructure, February 16, 2007.

Living people
People from Worksop
English businesspeople
Businesspeople in the pharmaceutical industry
1943 births